Elbio is a Spanish male given name. Notable people with the name include:

 Elbio Anaya (1889–1986), Argentinian general
 Elbio Rosselli, Uruguayan politician
 Elbio Álvarez (born 1994), Uruguayan football player

Spanish masculine given names